Stoyan (Bulgarian): Стоян is a Bulgarian name derived from the verb Stoya (Стоя, to stand). The variant Stoian also appears in Romanian, and in northern Greece as Stogiannis (Greek: Στογιάννης).

Given name
Stoyan Stoyanov (b. 1995), Bulgarian Mechanical Engineer
Stoyan Abrashev (b. 1988), Bulgarian footballer
Stoyan Alexandrov (1949–2020), Bulgarian economist
Stoyan Apostolov (b. 1946), Bulgarian wrestler
Stoyan Balov (b. 1960), Bulgarian wrestler
Stoyan Danev (1858–1949), Bulgarian liberal politician and twice Prime Minister
Stoyan Deltchev (b. 1959), Bulgarian gymnast
Stoyan Gadev (1931–1999), Bulgarian actor
Stoyan Ganev (1955–2013), Bulgarian diplomat and politician
Stoyan Gunchev (b. 1958), Bulgarian volleyball player
Stoyan Georgiev (b. 1986), Bulgarian footballer
Stoyan N. Karastoyanoff, American architect
Stoyan Kitov (b. 1938), Bulgarian footballer
Stoyan Kolev (b. 1976), Bulgarian goalkeeper
Stoyan Nikolov (b. 1949), Bulgarian wrestler
Stoyan Mihaylovski (1856–1927), Bulgarian writer
Stoyan Stoyanov Mihaylovski (1812–1875), Bulgarian cleric
Stoyan Ormandzhiev (1920–2006), Bulgarian footballer and manager
Stoyan Petkov, Bulgarian prelate
Stoyan Predev (b. 1993), Bulgarian footballer
Stoyan Radev, Bulgarian film and theatre director
Stoyan Stavrev (b. 1975), Bulgarian goalkeeper
Stoyan Stefanov (b. 1983), Bulgarian footballer
Stoyan Stoyanov (1913–1994), Bulgarian fighter pilot
Stoyan Todorov (b. 1982), Bulgarian footballer
Stoyan Yankulov (b. 1966), Bulgarian drummer
Stoyan Yordanov (b. 1944), Bulgarian goalkeeper
Stoyan Zagorchinov 1889–1969, Bulgarian writer
Stoyan Zaimov (1853–1932), Bulgarian revolutionary
Stoyan Zlatev (b. 1954), Bulgarian pentathlete
Stojan Todorchev (b. 1984), Bulgarian strongman
Stoyan Deyanov Petrov (b. 1999), Bulgarian Rapper

Surname
Denys Stoyan, Ukrainian football defender
Dietrich Stoyan, German mathematician and statistician
Maksym Stoyan (1980–), Ukrainian footballer

See also
Stoyanov
Stojan
Stojanov
Ilias Stogiannis
Stoyan Bachvarov Dramatic Theatre, a theatre in Varna

References

Bulgarian masculine given names
Slavic masculine given names